Gerard Escoda is the name of:

Gerard Escoda (alpine skier), Andorran skier
Gerard Escoda (footballer), Spanish footballer